Gummanahalli  is a village in the southern state of Karnataka, India. It is located in the Pandavapura taluk of Mandya district in Karnataka.

Demographics
 India census, Gummanahalli had a population of 5668 with 2837 males and 2831 females.

See also
 Mandya
 Krishnarajpet
 Pandavapura
 Chinakurali

References

External links
 http://Mandya.nic.in/

Villages in Mandya district